Clare Chambers may refer to:
Clare Chambers (novelist), English novelist
 Clare Chambers (philosopher), professor of philosophy
Claire Chambers (businesswoman), CEO of Journelle